Torre's cave rat (Boromys torrei) was a species of rodent in the family Echimyidae.
It was endemic to Cuba.
Its natural habitat was subtropical or tropical moist lowland forests.

References

Boromys
Rodent extinctions since 1500
Mammals described in 1917
Taxonomy articles created by Polbot
Extinct animals of Cuba
Endemic fauna of Cuba